Acmosara polyxena is a species of moth in the  family Yponomeutidae. It is found in Australia.

References

Moths described in 1886
Yponomeutidae
Moths of Australia